The Desertas Islands ("Deserted Islands") are a small archipelago in the Atlantic Ocean, part of the larger Portuguese Madeira Archipelago.

The archipelago is located off the coast of Morocco.

Geography

The Desertas Islands, from north to south with approximate area figures, are:

Administration
Administratively, the islands are part of the Municipality of Santa Cruz in Madeira, and in the Santa Cruz civil parish.

The islands are a designated Portuguese nature reserve. A licence is needed to land there.

Natural history

Though near the main island of Madeira, where the islands can often be seen on the horizon, the geology of the Ilhas Desertas is starkly different. The high, long, and rocky islands of the group are barren of topsoil, and the only wildlife consists of about sixteen species of birds, including eight species of seabirds, and a scarce population of feral goats, rabbits, and rodents, brought from Portugal by the mariners who first reached the rocky shores. The Deserta Grande wolf spider and Madeiran wall lizard also exist in the fragile and arid ecosystem.

The only inhabitable island, with its own water source, is Deserta Grande. This water is murky and scarce, and historic attempts to colonise the island failed due to the impracticability of agriculture.

A tiny colony of Mediterranean monk seals inhabit the beaches, and since 1990 the islands have been constituted as a nature reserve for their protection. In 1998 the colony numbered only eight, now the population is approximately forty seals. The only human presence is the permanent wardens, geologists, occasional boaters, and the few research stations on the islands.

Important Bird Area
The Desertas archipelago has been recognised as an Important Bird Area (IBA) by BirdLife International because of its seabird colonies. These include Fea's and Bulwer's petrels, Cory's and Barolo shearwaters, band-rumped storm petrels, common terns and Caspian gulls.

See also
Islands of the Autonomous Region of Madeira
List of islands of Portugal

References

External links 

Topographic map of the Desertas Islands (1:250,000)

Islands of the Autonomous Region of Madeira
Islands of Macaronesia
Nature reserves in Portugal
Uninhabited islands of Portugal
Archipelagoes of Portugal
Natura 2000 in Portugal
Important Bird Areas of Madeira